Madhav Das Nalapat (born 1950) is India's first Professor of Geopolitics and the UNESCO Peace Chair at Manipal University, where he is vice-chair of Manipal Advanced Research Group and Director of the Department of Geopolitics & International Relations. A journalist and a former Editor of The Times of India and of Mathrubhumi, he is currently the editorial director of ITV Network & The Sunday Guardian-India. Since 2020, he is a member of the executive committee of the Editors Guild of India.

Nalapat writes extensively on security, policy and international affairs. Apart from his Sunday Guardian column, his writings have been published in a very wide range of publications, including the Pakistan Observer.,
Gateway House: Indian Council on Global Relations, 
United Press International,
China Daily,
The Diplomat,
Radio Free Europe/Radio Liberty,
Economic and Political Weekly,
Rediff,
and CNN Global Public Square.

Background and family
Nalapat was born into a Malayalam-speaking Nair family with rich literary associations, the eldest of the three sons of Kalipurayeth Madhav Das and his wife Kamala Das. His father, K. Madhav Das, was a banker who played a part in India's agriculture reforms in 1960. His mother is poet and writer Kamala Das, also known as Madhavikutty, and as "Kamala Surayya" after her late-in-life conversion to Islam. 

Nalapat's paternal grandfather, Subramania Iyer, a Tamil Brahmin gentleman, edited the Malabar Quarterly Review. Nalapat's maternal grandfather V. M. Nair was Managing Editor and also Managing Director of Mathrubhumi, the widest circulating Malayalam daily, and he served as Chairman of the Press Trust of India for a peropd. Nalapat's maternal grandmother, Balamani Amma, was a distinguished writer and translator. Nalapat's larger family includes the rationalist and politician Nalapat Narayana Menon (Balamani Amma's maternal iuncle), and the half-Malayali, half-Irish, satirist, critic and novelist Aubrey Menen.

Nalapat is married to Lakshmi Bayi, Princess of Travancore. The erstwhile princely state of Travancore was a large and very ancient kingdom, which encompassed most of Kerala and parts of Tamil Nadu until it was merged into the Union of India in 1948. Princess Lakshmi Bayi is the maternal niece of Moolam Thirunal Rama Varma, the present Maharaja of Travancore. As per the Marumakkathayam system of Matrilineal succession prevailing in the state, the succession should have passed through Lakshmi Bayi, and her sons should have become Maharajas of Travancore. However, Nalapat and Lakshmi Bayi have no children. 

Nalapat was educated at The Frank Anthony Public School, New Delhi and graduated a Gold-Medallist in economics from the University of Bombay (now University of Mumbai).

Career
He began his academic career as fellow of the Centre for Political Research in 1974. Four years later he moved to business management, taking over as executive director of the Mathrubhumi Printing and Publishing Company Limited, where he implemented the Thiruvananthapuram edition project in the record time of twenty-seven months. The Malayalam word "Mathrubhumi" translates to "mother land" in English.

In 1984, he switched to the editorial side, taking over as Editor of the Mathrubhumi Daily and the Mathrubhumi Illustrated Weekly. Between 1984 and 1988 ABC figures showed an exponential growth of circulation; when he left circulation was 500,000. As Editor, he gave prominence to the war against corruption and against social injustices such as discrimination against women and the socially disadvantaged. Both these themes have been consistent ever since in his writings.

In 1989, Nalapat switched from Malayalam to English language when he joined as resident Editor of The Times of India in Bangalore. In 1994, he was transferred to Delhi to become the Resident Editor, and during his tenure circulation again increased exponentially.

In 1998, Nalapat switched from media to academia at Manipal University, where Ramdas Pai was Chancellor, later establishing the department of Geopolitics and International Relations, where he still teaches. He is also a distinguished fellow of the University of Georgia USA.

In 1999, Nalapat published Indutva, sometimes called the workbook of a secular Nationalist. The book advocates his theory that Indians are a composite of all the cultures in the history of India and share a common cultural DNA, and that if differences are accepted and faiths are different but equal, a pragmatic way out of poverty into social harmony can be achieved. Promoting pathways to religious tolerance and societal progress are still key themes in his work.

He has written 7 books, the latest in 2014 being The Practice of Geopolitics which contains his writings over the years on various important themes of International Relations.

Prof. Nalapat has worked exhaustively for the betterment of India–United States relations, recognizing the importance of a robust partnership between the United States and India in matters of global strategy and security. Nalapat was the first to define the Indo-Pacific as stretching from the Horn of Africa, to Vladivostok, Alaska and Chile. In 2003 he pitched a concept in Washington for an Asian NATO that has since evolved into the Quadrilateral Alliance. In 2020 he introduced his concept of The Indo-Pacific Charter to protect democracy and preserve peace in the Indo-Pacific region.

Since 1980s, Nalapat worked to improve Sino-Indian relations, visiting the country lecturing and writing in Chinese publications and talking on CGTN, and repeatedly pointing to the complementarities between India and China. Since 2017 when it became clear the global context had changed, he has been alerting the world to China's ambitions of global supremacy and hegemony.

He has fostered India-Taiwan ties in 1992 Nalapat persuaded PV Narasimha Rao to set up representative offices in Delhi and Taipei. Also in 1992 Nalapat argued for full recognition of Israel and in 2003 with JINSA he organised the first ever India-Israel-US trilateral in New Delhi.

Nalapat had advisory roles with former PM Rajiv Gandhi and PM P. V. Narasimha Rao. He never claims a current advisory role but his influence is manifest.

In 1999, Nalapat was appointed UNESCO Peace Chair at Manipal University for higher education to promote an integrated system of research, training, information and documentation activities in the field of peace, human rights, democracy, tolerance, non-violence and international understanding.

Nalapat's writings are published in four continents; his intellectual and academic analysis stretches from Europe, to the Indian Ocean, to the Atlantic and Pacific Oceans; he is known for his advocacy of free speech and freedom of press, transparency of governance and bureaucracy, defence of democracy and creating C21st education policy and systems in India that include India's civilisational history.

Nalapat has been the President of the International Interfaith Dialogue India. His vision for a stable world is reflected in his peacebuilding efforts; some examples are his associations with ASEAN, BRICS, RIC, the Quadrilateral Alliance, the Anglosphere, The Global Peace Foundation and Sravasti.

Apart from his work, he has played a key role in the literacy movement in Kerala, as the first honorary coordinator of the Kerala Association for Non-formal Education and Development. He was also the honorary secretary of the Kerala Children's Film Society, which screens educational films for children. He has also been active in environmental issues as honorary secretary of the Kerala Forestry Board. Recently Nalapat has been actively associated with "Swachh Bharat" (Clean India). He has been active in helping set up Water ATMs, where for a rupee a litre of drinking water can be accessed by the citizen.

Recently Nalapat has also given talks at literary festivals and at India Narrative, Sangam, M.A.S.T., Foreign Correspondents Club Hong Kong, National Maritime Foundation, Virat Hindustan Sangam, Rotary Club Bombay and the Indian Institute of Mass Communication.

Current affiliations
UNESCO Chair for the Promotion of the Culture of Peace and Non-Violence
Honorary Director, Department of Geopolitics & International Relations, Manipal Academy of Higher Education(An Institution of Eminence by the MHRD, Government of India)
Vice-chair, Manipal Advanced Research Group (MARG)
Editorial Director, The Sunday Guardian and Itv network (India)
Executive Committee Member, Editors Guild of India
Editor-in-Chief, Science, Technology and Security forum
Foreign Policy expert, Gateway House: Indian Council on Global Relations
Member of advisory board, India, China & America Institute, Georgia
Member of Resource Board, Center for International Relations, Washington D.C.
Member, Global Peace Foundation
Member of the Advisory Council, Naveen Hindustan Foundation, New Delhi
Advisor, Asianet Communications Ltd, Thiruvananthapuram
Life Member, Institute of Social & Economic Change, Bengaluru
Senior Associate, National Institute of Advanced Studies, Bengaluru
Associate Member, United Services Institution, New Delhi
Advisory Board Member, Institute of Management, Meerut

References

External links
Online collection of MD Nalapat publications

UNESCO officials
Geopoliticians
Academic staff of Manipal Academy of Higher Education
University of Mumbai alumni
Malayali people
People from Kerala
Living people
Manipal Academy of Higher Education alumni
Indian officials of the United Nations
1950 births